The Mbuba road tanker explosion was the traffic collision and explosion of a tank truck on 6 October 2018 in Kongo Central, in the Democratic Republic of the Congo. The vehicle collided with another truck in the village of Mbuba and later exploded, killing at least 50 people and injuring more than 100 others.

Following the crash, villagers of Mbuba started to collect fuel which leaked from the vehicles. After few minutes, fuel began to burn and destroy nearby houses.

The United Nations mission in DRC, MONUSCO, had sent nine ambulances to the Kisantu, which is where the most of injured were evacuated to shortly after accident.

References 

2018 in the Democratic Republic of the Congo
2018 road incidents
2018 fires in Africa
2010s road incidents in Africa
Deaths caused by petroleum looting
Explosions in 2018
Explosions in the Democratic Republic of the Congo
Kongo Central
October 2018 events in Africa
Transport disasters in the Democratic Republic of the Congo
Tanker explosions